Night Lights: A Collection of Previously Unreleased Songs is a compilation album released by American pop punk band Punchline on December 1, 2009, compiling 20 of the band's b-sides from the past 6–7 years.

The album was released as a donation based digital album from the band's webstore.  Any person who donated $6 or more got the complete album, while anyone who donated less (or nothing at all) got only the first six tracks.  All proceeds go towards the recording of Punchine's next album.

Track listing
 "Heart of Gold" – 3:45
 "Changing Lanes" – 3:57
 "Pretty Petty" – 3:38
 "Over You" – 3:10
 "She Always Leaves" – 3:47
 "Castaway (punk version)" – 3:43
 "I Live a Lie" – 3:15
 "Behind the Scenes" – 3:16
 "Downtown" – 2:59
 "Let a Lion" – 1:23
 "Battlescars (acoustic) – 4:44
 "Coldest of Calendars (piano version)" – 3:45
 "Getting There is Getting By (acoustic)" – 4:10
 "A Trip to the Other Side" – 2:47
 "Icicles" – 3:22
 "All Hopped Up On Jingle Bells" – 2:29
 "Don't Try This At Home (acoustic)" – 4:16
 "Greenlight (acoustic)" – 4:04
 "Pretty Petty (2005)" – 2:34
 "Punish or PJ" – 2:32

References

External links
 Purchase Album

Punchline (band) albums
2009 compilation albums